Papilio memnon, the great Mormon, is a large butterfly native to southern Asia that belongs to the swallowtail family. It is widely distributed and has thirteen subspecies. The female is polymorphic and with mimetic forms.

Range
Its range includes north-eastern India (including Sikkim, Assam and Nagaland), Nepal, Bangladesh, Myanmar, Nicobar Islands, Andaman Islands (stragglers only), western, southern and eastern China (including Hainan), Taiwan, southern Japan including Ryukyu Islands, Thailand, Laos, Vietnam, Kampuchea, Malaysia and Indonesia (Sumatra, Mentawai Islands, Nias, Batu, Simeulue, Bangka, Java, Kalimantan and the Lesser Sunda Islands).

Status
This species is common and not threatened. The cultivation of citrus all over Southern Asia provides an abundance of food plants.

Description and polymorphy
The butterfly is large with a  span. It has four male and many female forms, the females being highly polymorphic and many of them being mimics of unpalatable butterflies. This species has been studied extensively for understanding the genetic basis for polymorphy and Batesian mimicry. As many as twenty-six female forms are reported.

Typical form agenor

Male. Tailless, above deep blue to black. It may or may not have red streak on the forewing at the base of the cell.
Female. Tailless. Upperside forewing ground colour sepia, streaked with greyish white. The basal third part of the cell is red and is touched outwardly with white. Upper hindwing is blue black. It has five to seven yellow or white discal patches.

Female form butlerianus
Tailless. Resembles the typical male. Both wings are dark sepia. The forewing has a white area on the inner margin. The hindwing is scaled with blue.

Female form alcanor
Tailed. The sides of the abdomen are yellow.
Upperside forewing greyish brown with veins and streaks between them black. The cell is red at the base. There is a velvety black patch at the bases of veins 1 and 2 of the upperside forewing.
Upperside hindwing is black with part of the cell white. There are white streaks around it. The tornus is red with a large black spot. There is a row of red terminal spots between the vein.

Male and female form polymnestoroides
Tailless.
Male. Upperside hindwing and forewing have short blue discal stripes.
Female.  The upperside forewing is sepia with pale grey streaks amongst the veins. The base of the cell is red. The upperside hindwing is velvety brown with a blue discal area and has black spots, as in the case of the blue Mormon (P. polymnestor), which it mimics.

Habitat

Behaviour

This butterfly is found in forest clearings. It is very common and is also seen amongst human habitation. It visits flowers of Poinsettia, Jasminum, Lantana, Canna and Salvia. The butterfly is known to mud-puddle. The males are much more common than females. The female forms butlerianus and alcanor are especially uncommon.

Life cycle
The larva resembles that of the common Mormon (P. polytes), being green with whitish markings. It is heavily parasitised.

Gallery

See also
 List of butterflies of India (Papilionidae)

References

Further reading

Leech, John Henry (1892–94). Butterflies from China, Japan, and Corea. London: R.H. Porter.

External links
 

memnon
Butterflies of Oceania
Butterflies of Indochina
Butterflies of Asia
Butterflies of Indonesia
Butterflies of Malaysia
Butterflies of Singapore
Lepidoptera of the Philippines
Lepidoptera of New Guinea
Butterflies described in 1758
Taxa named by Carl Linnaeus